PTQ implant is a type of bio-compatible injectable bulking agent used in urinary and fecal incontinence. The material is a type of silicone, and is injected into the desired area to bulk out the tissues and reduce incontinence symptoms.

References

Implants (medicine)
Incontinence